Gastrophysa polygoni is a species of leaf beetle in the subfamily Chrysomelinae. It was described by Carl Linnaeus in 1758. The species can be up to 5mm long and is green-blue in colour. The thorax is orange and the wing cases are a metallic green, and the beetle can be seen in spring and summer.

References

Beetles described in 1758
Chrysomelinae
Taxa named by Carl Linnaeus